The Jami Institute of Technology (JIT) (Musish-e Âmvâresh-e 'ali-ye Jami) was established in 2007, under the aegis of the Iranian Ministry of Science, Research and Technology. It is located in Isfahan. The main mission of the institute is to educate students and contribute to international research in various fields of engineering comprising, among others, mechanical engineering, chemical engineering, civil engineering, industrial engineering, health and safety engineering and environmental engineering.

According to these missions, the annual "Congress of Applications of Chemistry in Novel Technologies" (CAAT) and the "Conference of Nanotechnology from Theory to Application" (NCNTA) are sponsored by JIT, and are held yearly in the Aseman Hotel.

References

External links 
 Official website of JIT with English option
 Official website of JIT
 Official website of CAAT
 Official web site of NCNTA

Education in Isfahan
Universities in Iran
Buildings and structures in Isfahan
Universities in Isfahan Province